HMS Medina was a  which served with the Royal Navy during the First World War. The M class were an improvement on the previous , capable of higher speed. Originally laid down as HMS Redmill by J. Samuel White at East Cowes on the Isle of Wight, the vessel was renamed before being launched in 1916. The ship was allocated to the Grand Fleet and spent much of its service in anti-submarine warfare, either escorting convoys or involved in submarine hunting patrols. Although the destroyer attacked a number of German submarines, none were sunk. After the War, Medina was reassigned to a defence flotilla in Portsmouth and was eventually sold to be broken up in 1921.

Design and development
Medina was one of eighteen  destroyers ordered by the British Admiralty in May 1915 as part of the Fifth War Construction Programme. The M class was an improved version of the earlier  destroyers, required to reach a higher speed in order to counter rumoured German fast destroyers. It transpired that the German ships did not exist.

Displacement was  normal. The vessel achieved  in trials. Three funnels were fitted.

Armament consisted of three single QF  Mk IV guns on the ship's centreline, with one on the forecastle, one aft on a raised platform and one between the middle and aft funnels on a bandstand. Torpedo armament consisted of two twin mounts for  torpedoes. A single QF 2-pounder  "pom-pom" anti-aircraft gun was mounted between the torpedo tubes. Medina was equipped with a paravane for anti-submarine warfare and minesweeping. The ship had a complement of 80 officers and ratings.

Construction and career
Redmill was laid down by J. Samuel White at East Cowes on the Isle of Wight on 23 September 1915 with the yard number 1467, and launched on 8 March the folliowing year. The ship was completed on 30 June 1916 and joined the Grand Fleet. By this time, the ship's name had already been changed to Medina.after the river. The vessel was deployed as part of the Grand Fleet, joining the Fourteenth Destroyer Flotilla based at Scapa Flow.

Still attached to the Fourteenth Destroyer Flotilla, early in 1917, the destroyer was transferred to Plymouth and allocated to anti-submarine patrols. During March, the ship was moved to Devonport, continuing to hunt for German submarines, although no submarines were sunk. Later, on 9 June, the destroyer attacked , but not before the merchant ship SS Appledore had been sunk. Later in the year, the ship was transferred to the Irish coast, serving with the Northern Division based in Buncrana. This service also involved confrontations with submarines, this time while escorting convoys. These were similarly unsuccessful and instead the crew had to watch, for example, the loss of the tanker SS Argalia on 6 August while under escort.

After the Armistice of 11 November 1918 that ended the war, Medina was transferred to the local defence flotilla at Portsmouth, attached to Fisguard. However, as the Royal Navy returned to a peacetime level of strength, both the number of ships and the amount of personnel needed to be reduced to save money. On 9 May 1921, Medina was sold to Thos. W. Ward of Milford Haven and subsequently broken up.

Pennant numbers

References

Citations

Bibliography

 
 
 
 
 
 
 
 
 
 
 
 
 
 
 

1916 ships
Admiralty M-class destroyers
Ships built on the Isle of Wight
World War I destroyers of the United Kingdom